Studley Park may refer to:

Studley Park, Narellan, Sydney
Yarra Bend Park, Melbourne